Márokföld is a village in Zala County, Hungary. It has a population of 46 people.

References

Populated places in Zala County